Line 11 may refer to several commuter rail lines:

China
 Line 11 (Beijing Subway)
 Line 11 (Guangzhou Metro), under construction
 Line 11 (Qingdao Metro)
 Line 11 (Shanghai Metro)
 Line 11 (Shenzhen Metro)
 Line 11 (Wuhan Metro)

India
 Line 11 (Mumbai Metro)
 Indigo Line (Delhi Metro)

Spain
 Line 11 (Madrid Metro)
 Barcelona Metro line 11

Other countries
 Line 11 (CPTM), São Paulo, Brazil
 Line 11 (Moscow Metro), now the Kakhovskaya line, Russia
 Line 11 (Stockholm Metro), a service on the Blue line, Sweden
 Downtown MRT line, Singapore
 Paris Métro Line 11, France
 S11 (ZVV), Zurich, Switzerland
 SEPTA Route 11, Philadelphia, Pennsylvania, US
 Shah Alam Line, numbered 11, Malaysia
 Tokyo Metro Hanzōmon Line, known as Line 11 in the planning stage, Japan